Filippo Moyersoen (born 30 August 1954) is an Italian equestrian. He competed in the team jumping event at the 1984 Summer Olympics.

References

External links
 

1954 births
Living people
Italian male equestrians
Olympic equestrians of Italy
Equestrians at the 1984 Summer Olympics
Sportspeople from Milan